Duncan Kellaway (born 17 February 1973) is a former Australian rules football player who played for the Richmond Football Club in the Australian Football League (AFL).

Educated at Caulfield Grammar School, Kellaway debuted for Richmond in 1993, tallying 27 possessions in his first AFL match. He played State of Origin football on several occasions for Victoria, and retired in 2004 having played 180 senior games. He played just eight games in his final two seasons due to injuries. His brother Andrew was drafted to Richmond in 1997, and they lined up in the same back line.

He joined the Adelaide Football Club as the Physio and Rehab Coach in 2012. Kellaway was employed as a physiotherapist at the Geelong Football Club from 2005 to 2011.

References 

 Hogan P: The Tigers Of Old, Richmond FC, Melbourne 1996

External links
 

1973 births
People educated at Caulfield Grammar School
Living people
Richmond Football Club players
Caulfield Grammarians Football Club players
Australian rules footballers from Victoria (Australia)
Victorian State of Origin players